Harib Jamil Zaid Al-Saadi (born 1 February 1990), commonly known as Harib Al-Saadi, is an Omani footballer who plays as an attacking midfielder for Dhofar.

Club career
On 3 June 2014, he signed a contract with 2014 GCC Champions League runners-up Saham SC.

Club career statistics

International career
Harib is part of the first team squad of the Oman national football team. He was selected for the national team for the first time in 2016. He made his first appearance for Oman on 24 March 2016 in a 2018 FIFA World Cup Qualification match against Guam.

International goals
Scores and results list Oman's goal tally first.

Honours

Club
 With Al-Suwaiq
Omani League (1): 2010–11, 2012–13
Sultan Qaboos Cup (1): 2012
Omani Super Cup (1): 2013; Runner-Up 2011

References

External links
 
 Harib Al Saadi at Goal.com
 
 

1990 births
Living people
People from Al-Rustaq
Omani footballers
Oman international footballers
Association football midfielders
Suwaiq Club players
Saham SC players
Dhofar Club players
Oman Professional League players
Al Jazira Club players
UAE Pro League players
Expatriate footballers in the United Arab Emirates
2019 AFC Asian Cup players